Latvian Higher League 2009 was the 18th season of top-tier football in Latvia. It began on 14 March 2009 with the first round of games and ended on 8 November 2009 with the 36th round of matches. Ventspils were the defending champions.

Due to numerous pre-season team changes, such as club mergers and withdrawals, the format of the league was changed. Since there are only 9 clubs that participate in 2009 Virslīga, every team plays 4 times against every other team, what will make every team playing 32 games. Contrary to the previous season, there is not Championship and Relegation pool.

Teams
Olimps Rīga were relegated after finishing the relegation round in last place. They were replaced by First League champions FK Daugava Riga.

Blāzma won the promotion/relegation play-off against Tranzīts Ventspils with 6–1 on aggregate. However, after several mergers and withdrawals Tranzīts were also awarded a place in Virslīga, as the runners-up of First League.

FK Rīga withdrew due to unpaid debts. They eventually merged with Olimps Rīga and created a new club called Olimps/RFS. The new club plays in Virslīga, what saved Olimps Rīga from relegation.

On 12 January 2009 Vindava withdrew from Virslīga due to financial reasons.

FK Jūrmala merged with JFC Kauguri/Multibanka, which is also a merger of JFC Kauguri Jūrmala and FK Multibanka Rīga, to a new club named FK Jūrmala-VV. The new club carried over the players and other personnel from FK Jūrmala.

Daugava Daugavpils and Dinaburg also merged and remained under the Dinaburg FC name. It is not yet certain which club's staff will operate the new club. Dinaburg also took Daugava's 2009–10 UEFA Europa League spot.

League table

Results

First half of season

Second half of season

Relegation play-offs
Since there are only 9 clubs participating in 2009 Virslīga, no teams will be directly relegated. 9th placed Virslīga team and runners-up of First League will compete in relegation play-offs for one spot in Virslīga 2010. The other spot will be taken by First League champions. Since one of the teams were excluded from the league, the relegation play-off will be replaced with the direct promotion of the First League team placing second.

Team of the season 2009
Goalkeepers: Viktors Spole  (FK Liepājas Metalurgs ), 
Aleksandrs Vlasovs (Skonto FC )

Defenders:
Oskars Kļava  (FK Liepājas Metalurgs ),
Grigori Chirkin  (FK Ventspils ),
Deniss Ivanovs  (FK Liepājas Metalurgs ),
David Gamezardashvili  (Skonto FC ),
Tomas Tamošauskas  (FK Liepājas Metalurgs ),
Vitālijs Smirnovs  (Skonto FC ),
Deniss Kačanovs  (FK Ventspils ),
Dzintars Zirnis  (FK Liepājas Metalurgs )

Midfielders:
Jurijs Žigajevs  (FK Ventspils ),
Andrejs Prohorenkovs  (FK Liepājas Metalurgs ),
Vitālijs Astafjevs  (FK Ventspils ),
Jevgēņijs Kosmačovs  (FK Ventspils ),
Maksims Rafaļskis  (FK Liepājas Metalurgs ),
Igors Kozlovs (Skonto FC ),
Pāvels Surņins  (FK Liepājas Metalurgs ),
Igor Tigirlas  (FK Ventspils )

Forwards:
Vits Rimkus  (FK Ventspils ),
Vladimir Dvalishvili  (Skonto FC ),
Kristaps Grebis  (FK Liepājas Metalurgs ),
Ģirts Karlsons  (FK Liepājas Metalurgs )

See also
 2009–10 Latvian Cup

References

External links
 Latvian Football Federation 
 Latvian Football Federation news 

Latvian Higher League seasons
1
Latvia
Latvia